is a 1959 Japanese drama film written and directed by Keisuke Kinoshita.

Plot
Upon witnessing the bridal procession of Sakura, the granddaughter of the Nagura family, Suteo, a young man of about 18, runs to the river banks, followed by his mother, Haruko, who fears for his life. In a series of flashbacks interspersed with the present, the viewer learns of the preceding events, starting during the Pacific War.

Expecting a child with Hideo, the second son of the Naguras, and both knowing that his family of landlords will neither approve of their relationship nor Hideo's reluctance to go to war, Haruko—a tenant farmer's daughter—agrees to commit double suicide with her lover. While Hideo dies, disavowed by his tyrannical father Tsuyochi for refusing to fight for his country, Haruko survives and is taken in by the Naguras to silence the gossip about the affair. Haruko gives birth to a son, whom Tsuyochi, without her consent, registers under the name of Suteo, which means "discarded male." Housed in a separate shack, Haruko and Suteo live as labourers, and the only family member to treat them kindly is Sakura, the daughter of Tsuyochi's first son Katsuyuki and his wife Tatsuko, who also live on the manor.

With the post-war agricultural land reform, the Naguras are forced to sell to the government all but the land they can reasonably farm themselves, losing their status over the former tenants who now acquire it. Tsuyochi devises a plan to regain their wealth by amassing timberland, but this requires an investment from Tatsuko's family, who instead purchases it for themselves, thus deepening the Nagura's resentment at their lost social position.

When Sakura grows older, Tomi prevents her from enrolling at a higher school away from the village like her friends do, instead privately tutoring her in dance and music, intending to marry her into a wealthy family that will help sustain the Naguras. Suteo, now a young man, confesses his love to Sakura, and although she feels the same for him, Sakura decides that the only way to escape her overbearing family is by giving in to an arranged marriage that is conditioned on moving away to her groom's domain.

Returning to the film's opening scenes, Haruko catches up with her son, afraid that he might try to commit suicide like once she and Hideo did. She promises, now that Suteo has grown up, to leave for Tokyo together and begin a new life on their own.

Cast
 Keiko Kishi as Haruko
 Yoshiko Kuga as Sakura
 Yūsuke Kawazu as Suteo
 Ineko Arima as Sachiko
 Chieko Higashiyama as Tomi, Hideo's mother
 Yasushi Nagata as Tsuyochi, Hideo's father
 Chishū Ryū as Yakichi
 Toshio Hosokawa as Katsuyuki, Sakura's father
 Kuniko Igawa as Tatsuko, Sakura's mother
 Masanao Kawakane as Hideo
 Masako Izumi as Sakura (child)

Legacy
Film historian Donald Richie saw The Snow Flurry, due to its fragmented, nonlinear storytelling manner, as a predecessor of Shochiku's New Wave films.

References

External links
 
 
 

1959 films
1959 drama films
Japanese drama films
Films directed by Keisuke Kinoshita
Films with screenplays by Keisuke Kinoshita
Shochiku films
New Wave in cinema
1950s Japanese films